Brendan Buckley (born February 26, 1977) is an American former professional ice hockey defenseman. He is currently an assistant coach for the Boston College Eagles.

Career
Buckley was drafted 117th overall by the Mighty Ducks of Anaheim in the 1996 NHL Entry Draft from Boston College. Although he never played in the NHL, Buckley played 569 regular-season games in the American Hockey League for the Cincinnati Mighty Ducks, Wilkes-Barre/Scranton Penguins, Syracuse Crunch, Worcester IceCats, Peoria Rivermen, Manchester Monarchs, Worcester Sharks, and Chicago Wolves.

After retiring from professional hockey in 2011, Buckley joined Buckley Sports Management where he served as Vice President and Director of Recruiting.  He has also served as the Tier 1 Commissioner and Tournament Director for the Eastern Hockey Federation in Boston since 2012. On July 8, 2015, Buckley became an assistant coach for the University of Connecticut men's hockey team. In 2018, he returned to Boston College as an assistant coach.

References

External links

1977 births
American men's ice hockey defensemen
Anaheim Ducks draft picks
EHC Black Wings Linz players
Boston College Eagles men's ice hockey players
Chicago Wolves players
Cincinnati Mighty Ducks players
Ice hockey players from Massachusetts
Iserlohn Roosters players
Quad City Mallards (UHL) players
Living people
Manchester Monarchs (AHL) players
Sportspeople from Needham, Massachusetts
Peoria Rivermen (AHL) players
Ritten Sport players
Syracuse Crunch players
Wilkes-Barre/Scranton Penguins players
Worcester IceCats players
Worcester Sharks players